The 2016 World Seniors Championship (Known for sponsorship reasons as the 888sport World Seniors Championship) was a snooker tournament that took place on 30–31 January 2016 at the Guild Hall in Preston, England. Players had to be at least 40 years old at the end of the 2015/16 season.

The championship was won by Mark Davis, who beat Darren Morgan 2–1 in the final. Defending champion Mark Williams lost to Anthony Hamilton in the last-16 round.

Prize fund 
The breakdown of prize money for this year is shown below:
 Winner: £18,000
 Runner-up: £8,000
 Semi-finalist: £4,000
 Quarter-finalist: £2,000
 Last 16: £1,000
 Total: £50,000

Field 
Previous winners of the World Seniors Championship and the World Snooker Championship were exempted from qualifying and went directly into the last 16.
 Nigel Bond - 2012 World Seniors Champion
 Ken Doherty - 1997 World Champion
 Peter Ebdon - 2002 World Champion
 Joe Johnson - 1986 World Champion
 Darren Morgan - 2011 World Seniors Champion
 John Parrott - 1991 World Champion
 Jimmy White - 2010 World Seniors Champion
 Mark Williams - 	2000, 2003 World Champion, 2015 World Seniors Champion

Main draw 
The draw for the last 16 was made on 23 December 2015. The draw for the quarter-finals and semi-finals were made on a random basis after the previous round had finished. The last-16 round was played on 30 January with the quarter-finals on the afternoon of 31 January and the semi-finals and final on the same evening.

Final

Qualifying 
These matches were played on 21 and 22 December 2015 at the Robin Park Arena, Sports and Tennis Centre in Wigan, England.

Centuries

Main event centuries

 104  Dominic Dale

Qualifying stage centuries

 116  Lee Walker

References 

2016
2016 in snooker
2016 in English sport
Sport in Preston
January 2016 sports events in the United Kingdom